Jeremy Garrett (born 1 January 2000) is a Guyana international footballer who plays as a defender for the Guyana Defence Force.

In 2018, Garrett secured a scholarship with Louisiana State University at Eunice and studies Rehabilitation Science .

In 2020 he was selected to play for the Guyana national team as a central defender.

In January 2021, he officially left Fruta Conquerors for Guyana Defence Force team, seeking a more professional training program.

Career statistics

Club

Notes

International

References

External links
 
 Jeremy Garrett at the Louisiana State University at Eunice

2000 births
Living people
Association football defenders
Guyanese footballers
Guyanese expatriate footballers
Guyana youth international footballers
Guyana international footballers
Fruta Conquerors FC players
Expatriate soccer players in the United States
Guyanese expatriate sportspeople in the United States